Working Together: Why Great Partnerships Succeed is a nonfiction book by American business executive and author Michael Eisner. It documents the former Walt Disney Company CEO's partnerships throughout his own career, plus others throughout modern history such as Warren Buffett and Charlie Munger, Bill Gates and Melinda Gates, and Brian Grazer and Ron Howard.

References

2010 non-fiction books
Harper & Row books
Michael Eisner